Dallas has been the name of more than one ship of the United States Revenue Cutter Service and United States Coast Guard, and may refer to:

 , a cutter in commission in the Revenue Cutter Service from 1816 to 1821
 , a cutter in commission in the Revenue Cutter Service from 1824 to 1836 that was renamed Dallas by 1830
 , a cutter in commission in the Revenue Cutter Service from 1846 to 1848
 , a cutter in commission in the Revenue Cutter Service from 1874 to 1907
 , a patrol boat in commission in the Coast Guard from 1925 to 1936
 , a high endurance cutter commissioned in 1967 and decommissioned in 2012. The vessel was then transferred to the Philippine Navy and renamed BRP Ramon Alcaraz (FF-16).

United States Coast Guard ship names